Georges Bereta (born 15 May 1946 in Saint-Étienne) is a French former football striker of Polish descent. From 1966 to 1974 he played for Saint-Étienne before moving onto Marseille until he retired in 1978.

Honours
Saint-Étienne
Division 1: 1966–67, 1967–68, 1968–69, 1969–70, 1973–74, 1974–75 
Coupe de France: 1967–68, 1969–70, 1973–74

Marseille
Coupe de France: 1975–76

References

External links
 
 
  
 
  

1946 births
AS Saint-Étienne players
Association football forwards
France international footballers
French footballers
Living people
Olympique de Marseille players
French people of Polish descent
Footballers from Saint-Étienne